Oswald Hermann Lange (June 1, 1912 – February 20, 2000) was a German-American aerospace engineer and member of the "von Braun rocket group".  He contributed to early military aerospace projects, including the V-2 and Wasserfall, and eventually became project director of Saturn V.

Biography

Lange earned his master's degree from the University of Breslau and PhD from Berlin Institute of Technology. He worked at Peenemünde from 1940 to 1945 on guidance and control aspects of the V-2 ballistic missile and the Wasserfall surface-to-air missile. After World War II, he worked at the Royal Aircraft Establishment (1947), but emigrated to the US in 1954, working briefly at Martin Aircraft. In 1959, he was naturalized as a US citizen and became head of the Saturn project office. He retired in 1977.

References

American aerospace engineers
Early spaceflight scientists
German emigrants to the United States
20th-century German inventors
German people of World War II
German rocket scientists
German spaceflight pioneers
1912 births
2000 deaths
20th-century American engineers
People from Chojnów
People from the Province of Silesia